The women's pole vault event at the 2000 World Junior Championships in Athletics was held in Santiago, Chile, at Estadio Nacional Julio Martínez Prádanos on 18 October.

Medalists

Results

Final
18 October

Participation
According to an unofficial count, 19 athletes from 15 countries participated in the event.

References

Pole vault
Pole vault at the World Athletics U20 Championships